Posledniye Novosti ('Latest News') was a Russian White émigré daily newspaper, organ of the Constitutional Democratic Party (Cadets). It was published in Paris from April 1920 to July 1940. Its editor was P. N. Milyukov.

References

Newspapers established in 1920
Russian-language newspapers
Publications disestablished in 1940
Defunct newspapers published in France
Newspapers published in Paris